The Ed Werenich Golden Wrench Classic is an annual bonspiel on the men's World Curling Tour. It is held annually in January at the Coyotes Curling Club in Tempe, Arizona. The event is named for two-time World Champion Ed Werenich.

Past champions

References

World Curling Tour events
Curling competitions in the United States
Sports in Tempe, Arizona
Curling in Arizona
Sports competitions in Maricopa County, Arizona